This is a list of prisons within Zhejiang province of the People's Republic of China.

Sources 

Buildings and structures in Zhejiang
Zhejiang